Falko Krismayr is a retired Austrian ski jumper.

In the World Cup he finished twice among the top 30, his best result being a 23rd place from Vikersund in February 1998.

He has a bronze medal from the 1997 World Junior Championships. He finished second overall in the 1997-1998 Continental Cup.

External links

Year of birth missing (living people)
Living people
Austrian male ski jumpers